Callithamnion is a genus of algae belonging to the family Callithamniaceae.

The genus was first described by Danish botanist Hans Christian Lyngbye in 1819, and the type species is Callithamnion corymbosum ., 

The genus has cosmopolitan distribution. Species are found in Europe (including Norway and Great Britain,), Australia, America (including Massachusetts, New York, North Carolina and Georgia), Newfoundland (Canada), Sri Lanka and South Africa.

The genus of Callithamnion has undergone 2 major changes in its history. Carl Nägeli (in 1861) transferred species without alternate branchlets to Antithamnion, Rhodochorton and Acrochaetium. Then Genevieve Feldmann-Mazoyer in 1941 created genus Aglaothamnion for species having uninucleate cells, zig-zag carpogonial branches and lobed groups of carposporangia, and re-circumscribed Callithamnion. Aglaothamnion is now sometimes regarded as a synonym of Callithamnion with insufficient evidence for separate evolutionary lines of development.

Description
Callithamnion species are a marine red alga that is monaxial (having only one axis) with free filaments and the thalli are usually small tufts.
They are also erect, up to 10 cm tall, with irregular branching and have multinucleate cells.
In most species are gametophytes and sporophytes are found throughout the year, but are usually only fertile in the late summer and autumn.

Species
As accepted by WoRMS and AlgaeBase;

 Callithamnion acutum 
 Callithamnion aglaothamniodes 
 Callithamnion apiculatum 
 Callithamnion apiculatum 
 Callithamnion arborescens 
 Callithamnion arrawarricum 
 Callithamnion axillare 
 Callithamnion biseriatum 
 Callithamnion bisporum 
 Callithamnion brachygonum 
 Callithamnion callithamnioides 
 Callithamnion catalinense 
 Callithamnion caulescens 
 Callithamnion circinnatum 
 Callithamnion codicola 
 Callithamnion colensoi 
 Callithamnion collabens 
 Callithamnion compactum 
 Callithamnion confertum 
 Callithamnion consanguineum 
 Callithamnion corymbosum 
 Callithamnion crispulum 
 Callithamnion cryptopterum 
 Callithamnion dasytrichum 
 Callithamnion debile 
 Callithamnion ecuadoreanum 
 Callithamnion ellipticum 
 Callithamnion elongellum 
 Callithamnion epiphyticum 
 Callithamnion exiguum 
 Callithamnion fallax 
 Callithamnion flabellatum 
 Callithamnion flagellare 
 Callithamnion gaudichaudii 
 Callithamnion gracile 
 Callithamnion grande 
 Callithamnion granulatum 
 Callithamnion griffithsioides 
 Callithamnion hamelii 
 Callithamnion hirtellum 
 Callithamnion hypneae 
 Callithamnion implicatum 
 Callithamnion japonicum 
 Callithamnion kirillianum 
 Callithamnion korffense 
 Callithamnion lanceolatum 
 Callithamnion larcinum 
 Callithamnion lasioides 
 Callithamnion marshallense 
 Callithamnion mildbraedii 
 Callithamnion montagnei 
 Callithamnion mytili 
 Callithamnion nipponicum 
 Callithamnion octosporum 
 Callithamnion pacificum 
 Callithamnion parvulum 
 Callithamnion paschale 
 Callithamnion pedicellatum 
 Callithamnion pennula 
 Callithamnion perpusillum 
 Callithamnion pikeanum 
 Callithamnion pinastroides 
 Callithamnion pinnatum 
 Callithamnion planum 
 Callithamnion plumulum 
 Callithamnion propebyssoides 
 Callithamnion puniceum 
 Callithamnion purpuriferum 
 Callithamnion pylaisaeanum 
 Callithamnion ramosissimum 
 Callithamnion reductum 
 Callithamnion rigescens 
 Callithamnion roseum 
 Callithamnion rupicola 
 Callithamnion rupinicola 
 Callithamnion semicorticatum 
 Callithamnion shepherdii 
 Callithamnion soccoriense 
 Callithamnion spinuliferum 
 Callithamnion stuposum 
 Callithamnion subsecundum 
 Callithamnion subverticillatum 
 Callithamnion tetragonum 
 Callithamnion tetricum 
 Callithamnion unilaterale 
 Callithamnion variegatum 
 Callithamnion veleroae 
 Callithamnion vieillardii 
 Callithamnion violaceum

References

Ceramiales
Red algae genera
Plants described in 1819